Saint-Christo-en-Jarez is a commune in the Loire department in central France.

Population

Twin towns
Saint-Christo-en-Jarez is twinned with:

  Brembio, Italy, since 2004

See also
Communes of the Loire department

References

Communes of Loire (department)